Gloria Daisy Wekker (born June 13, 1950) is an Afro-Surinamese Dutch emeritus professor (Utrecht University) and writer who has focused on gender studies and sexuality in the Afro-Caribbean region and diaspora. She was the winner of the Ruth Benedict Prize from the American Anthropological Association in 2007.

Biography
Gloria Wekker was born in 1950 in Paramaribo, Suriname. Her family migrated to the Netherlands when she was a one year old infant and lived in a neighborhood in Amsterdam that had formerly been predominantly Jewish prior to WWI.  She returned to Amsterdam in the 1970s and became active in the Afro-European Women’s Movement. Wekker earned a master's degree in cultural anthropology from the University of Amsterdam in 1981 and began her career working in various governmental agencies in Amsterdam, such as the Ministry of Health, Welfare and Culture on Ethnic Minorities' Affairs and the Ministry of Social Affairs and Employment. In 1984, she became a founding member of "Sister Outsider", an Amsterdam-based, literary circle for lesbian black women named after the work by Audre Lorde. In 1987, she served as a Policy Associate in the Office for the Coordination of Ethnic Minorities' Affairs.

In 1992, Wekker earned her doctorate at the University of California, Los Angeles with a thesis on the sexuality and subjectivity of Afro-Surinamese women. In 2001, she was appointed to the Aletta-chair of the Department of Women's Studies at the Utrecht University. Her work focuses on the intersections of colonialism, racism, white privilege, feminist theory, lesbian theory and women in the Caribbean. Her work has earned her the title of "Holland’s Angela Davis" as she has forced the Dutch to examine their alleged ingrained stereotypes and attitudes towards racism and patriarchy. She has led debate which questioned the racist nature of such iconic images in Dutch tradition as Sinterklaas (Santa Claus)'s helpers as blackface golliwogs known as Zwarte Piet (Black Pete), as well as the imagery of what constitutes beauty.

Wekker was nominated in 2004 for the Dutch Scientific Research Council's "Triomfprijs" (Triumph prize). In 2006, her book The Politics of Passion: Women's Sexual Culture in the Afro-Surinamese Diaspora won critical praise and was awarded with the 2007 Ruth Benedict Prize from the American Anthropological Association. Wekker gave the 2009 Mosse Lecture, titled Van Homo Nostalgie en betere tijden. Multiculturaliteit en postkolonialiteit (On Gay Nostalgia and better times. Multiculturalism and postcolonialism). In 2011, she began a sabbatical to work at the Netherlands Institute for Advanced Studies on a research project, which resulted in the publication in 2016 of White Innocence: Paradoxes of Colonialism and Race. In this book, Wekker utilizes a scavenger methodology by "work[ing] with interviews, watching TV and reading novels, analyzing email correspondence..." in order to develop a clear understanding of the Dutch cultural archive. Because of her work with both sociology and policy, Wekker led an international committee which was appointed at the University of Amsterdam in 2015 to increase diversity at the university. The committee published their findings in the report Let's do diversity in 2016.

Selected works

References

Sources

 Catalogus Professorum Academiae Rheno-Traiectinae

1950 births
Black feminism
Dutch anti-racism activists
Dutch feminists
Living people
People from Paramaribo
Gender studies academics
White culture scholars
Women educators
20th-century Dutch women writers
21st-century Dutch women writers
University of Amsterdam alumni
University of California, Davis alumni
Academic staff of Utrecht University
Feminist writers
Surinamese emigrants to the Netherlands
Surinamese women writers
Women human rights activists